Zoom at the Top is a 1962 Merrie Melodies cartoon directed by Chuck Jones and designer Maurice Noble. The short was released on June 30, 1962, and stars Wile E. Coyote and the Road Runner.

Plot 
The Road Runner (Disappearialis Quickius) zooms to the end of a cliff and watches as Wile E. Coyote (Overconfidentii Vulgaris) takes steps back on a different cliff, attempting to jump to the other side, and the end falls off when he steps on it, and the title appears. While falling, the rock turns upside down and Wile E. struggles to get on the new top side. He thinks that he made it to the top and starts panting, but then realizes he is actually upside down again. He gets the pointy end stuck between two cliff ends. He then goes on the left end, but that end falls off and hits the ground, and a small accordion-squished Wile E. walks away with the coney cliff end on him.

Later, Wile E., who is back to normal, then again chases the Road Runner. When the Road Runner stops at the top of a natural arch and gets Wile E. to stop as well, the bird points at the ground. Wile E.'s nose then points to the ground, before he falls to the ground once more. The Road Runner zips off and Wile E. tries to deduce how the bird managed to defy gravity, but finally admits he is clueless.

1. Wile E. then sets up a bear trap in the middle of the road, struggling in the process. Once the trap is set, he places a bowl of ACME Bird Seed on the trap's base and hides behind a rock. The Road Runner sees the bird seed, eats it and zooms off, but the trap does not go off. Confused, the Coyote approaches the trap with an oilcan, applies a tiny drop of oil to the base (while standing inside the trap), and then it finally closes—on him. The zigzag-shaped Coyote walks off with a deadpan "Ouch".

2. An attempt to chase the Road Runner with a jet mobile ends up with the motor's fire burning the support beam, causing the entire apparatus to collapse.

3. Wile E. uses an ACME Instant Icicle Maker. "Freeze Your Friend-Loads of Laughs". After experimenting on a cactus, he tries to freeze the Road Runner. As soon as he hears the "Beep-Beep", he jumps out on the road to see the approaching bird, but the machine then activates, freezing the Coyote instead. Wile E. tries to thaw himself out with a magnifying glass, but only ends up melting himself into a puddle along with the ice as well.

4. Finally, the Coyote paints iron glue on an ACME Boomerang, but when he prepares to launch the boomerang, the glue droops down onto his hand, sticking the Coyote onto the boomerang and carrying him with it as he throws it. While still in the air, Wile E. attempts to free himself from the sticky boomerang. He fights with it, but only ends up getting both his hands stuck on his head and the boomerang stuck on his back legs. He crashes rear first on the ground, then walks away side by side. An iris out shaped like a boomerang appears, then stops to show the words The End.

Crew
Co-Director & Layouts: Maurice Noble
Animation: Ken Harris, Richard Thompson, Bob Bransford, Tom Ray & Morey Reden
Backgrounds: Philip DeGuard
Film Editor: Treg Brown
Voice Characterizations: Mel Blanc & Paul Julian
Music: Milt Franklyn
Produced by David H. DePatie & John W. Burton
Written & Directed by Chuck Jones

References

External links
 
 

Merrie Melodies short films
Wile E. Coyote and the Road Runner films
1962 animated films
Short films directed by Chuck Jones
Films directed by Maurice Noble
Films scored by Milt Franklyn
1962 short films
Animated films about mammals
Animated films about birds
1960s Warner Bros. animated short films
1960s English-language films
American animated short films
Films about Canis
American comedy short films